Franco Margola (30 October 1908 – 9 March 1992, was one of the most important composers in the 20th-century Italian music scene. "He was an indefatigable teacher, lecturer, man of great culture, interested in literature, philosophy, religious history. His style was grounded in the classical tradition, but he was fairly open to the new techniques which were encircling the musical world" He was born in Orzinuovi (Brescia), and died in Nave (Brescia) aged 83.

Compositions

Operas 
Il mito di Caino
Il Titone (lost)

Symphonic works 
Sinfonia delle Isole, for string orchestra
Il campiello delle streghe (1930)
 Trittico for Strings (1936-7)
 Arioso for Strings (1939)
 Notturno e Fuga for String Orchestra (1940)
 Teorema armonico
 Sei Madrigali for Strings
 Antiche Musiche di Virginalisti Inglesi, for Strings
Sinfonia per orchestra (published by Bongiovanni in 1961)
Passacaglia per orchestra (published by Bongiovanni in 1962)

Concertos 
Violoncello Concerto Op. 91 (1949)
Kinderkonzert No. 1 for Piano and String Orchestra (1954)
Kinderkonzert No. 2 for Violin and Orchestra (1954)
Partita for Oboe and Strings
Little Concerto for Oboe and Strings
Concerto for Oboe and Strings [Unfinished]
Concertos for oboe, bassoon, horn, piano, violin, guitar, and a double concerto for violin, piano and strings.

Chamber music 
One quintet published in 1934.
8 String quartets (1935-1950)
Quintet for Piano and Strings No. 1, dC 17 (1933)
Quintet for Piano and Strings No. 2, dC 83 (1946)
Quartet No. 7 for Flute and String Trio, dC 87 (1948)
Sonatina a sei for Winds and Piano (1961)
La Longobarda, for Flute, Oboe, and Piano, dC 208 (1976)
Sonata a tre for Oboe, Clarinet and Bassoon
Quattro Bagatelle for Winds
Piccola Suonata for Violin and Piano (1929)
Cello Sonata in E major (between 1931–45)
Cello Sonata No. 3 in C major
Violin Sonata No. 1 in D major (1931)
Sonata Breve (No. 3) for Violin and Piano (1937)
Violin Sonata No. 4, Op. 32 No. 1 (1944)
Violin Sonata No. 5, Op. 32 No. 1 (1959)
Notturnino for Flute and Piano, dC 80 (1945)
Duo for Flute and Viola, dC 104 (1953)
Partita for Flute and Oboe, dC 115 (1956)
Three Pieces for Flute and Piano, dC 116 (1957)
Six Duets for Two Flutes, dC 184 (1974)
Sonata No. 4 for Flute and Guitar, dC 191 (1974-5)
Sonata for Flute and Piano, dC 230 (1978)'
Contrasts, for Flute and Contrabass, dC 324 (1983)
Five Impressions for Flute and Guitar, dC 698 (1985?)
Three Pieces for Clarinet and Piano
Three Pieces for Bassoon and Piano
Three Impressioni for Flute in G and Piano (19??)
Four sonatas for Flute and Guitar (1974, 75)

Piano Solo 
Burlesca, dC 1 (1928)
Danza a Notturno, dC 3
Il Cieco di Lorolenko, dC 7 (1929)
Tarantella-Rondò, dC 24 (1938)
Piccola Rapsodia d'Autunno, dC 28 (1941)
Valzer, dC 36 (1934)
Leggenda, dC 39 (1938)
Preludio in Do, dC 52 (1938)
Toccata, dC 55 (1938)
Sonata a Domenico Scarlatti, dC 60 (1944)
Preludio in La, dC 64 (1940)
Sonatina per Pianoforte, Op. 26, dC 71 (1942)
Mosaico, dC 95 (1952)
Sei Sonatine Facili, dC 108
Tre Pezzi, dC 111 (1955)
Quattro Sonatine, dC 112
Prima Sonata per Pianoforte, dC 113 (1956)
Seconda Sonata per Pianoforte, dC 117 (1957)
Terza Sonata per Pianoforte, dC 118 (1957)
Sonata Quarta per Pianoforte, dC 122 (1958)
Danza e Notturno, dC 123
Quindici Pezzi Facili, dC 160 (1970)
Altri Quindici Pezzi Facili, dC 179 (1973)
[Senza Titolo], dC 188
Primavera, dC 189 (1989)
Bagatella, dC 215 (19??)
Improvviso, dC 248 (1979)
Quinta Sonata per Pianoforte, dC 308 (1982)
Omaggio ad Uno frai i Più Grandi Musicisti 'Italiani d'Italia', dC 329 (1984)
[Senza Titolo], dC 616
[Senza Titolo], dC 617
[Senza Titolo], dC 619
[Senza Titolo], dC 622
[Senza Titolo], dC 623
[Senza Titolo], dC 626
[Senza Titolo], dC 627
[Senza Titolo], dC 628
Allegro con brio, dC 639
Mazurka, dC 641
Moderato, dC 642
Moderato, dC 643
Saltarello, dC 644

Solo Guitar 
Sonata No. 1
Sonata No. 2
Sei Bagatelle
Trittico
Meditativo
Ballata
Caccia
Ultimo Canto
Otto Miniature
Due Studi

References

Further reading
Cresti, Renzo (1994). Linguaggio musicale di Franco Margola. Milano: G. Miano. . Contains a worklist (pp. 63–78).

1908 births
1992 deaths
Musicians from the Province of Brescia
Italian classical composers
Italian male classical composers
Italian opera composers
Male opera composers
20th-century classical composers
20th-century Italian composers
20th-century Italian male musicians